David Brenner (November 3, 1962 – February 17, 2022) was an American film editor known (along with fellow film editors Joe Hutshing, Pietro Scalia, and Julie Monroe) for being one of director Oliver Stone's "hot shot" group of up-and-coming film editors. He was elected as a member of the American Cinema Editors. He died at the age of 59.

Filmography

Academy Award nominations & wins
1990 – Born on the Fourth of July (won w/ co-editor Joe Hutshing) Best Achievement in Film Editing

Other awards and nominations
1990 – Born on the Fourth of July (nominated) American Cinema Editors ACE Eddie - Best Edited Feature Film (w/ co-editor Joe Hutshing)
1997 – Independence Day (won) Satellite Awards (International Press Academy) - Golden Satellite for Outstanding Film Editing
2023 – Avatar: The Way of Water (nominated) (Critics Choice Association) - Critics' Choice Movie Award for Best Editing (w/ co-editor James Cameron, John Refoua and Stephen E. Rivkin)

References

External links

1962 births
2022 deaths
American Cinema Editors
American film editors
Best Film Editing Academy Award winners
People from Hollywood, Los Angeles